Witney is a surname. Notable people with the name include:

Charles Witney (1919–1991), Canadian politician
Col Witney (1920–2009), Australian rules footballer 
Michael Witney (1931–1983), American film and television actor
Thomas Witney or Thomas of Witney (fl. 1292–1342), an English master mason 
William Witney (1915–2002), American film and television director

See also
Whitney (given name)
Whitney (surname)

Witney Carson (born 1993), American ballroom dancer and choreographer